Thomas Carell (born 1966) is a German biochemist.

Carell was born in 1966 in Herford Germany, he studied chemistry from 1985 till 1990 at the University of Münster finishing with a diploma thesis at the Max Planck Institute for Medical Research Heidelberg. After his PhD thesis on Porphyrin chemistry at the same institute, he did his postdoctoral at the Massachusetts Institute of Technology in 1993. He finished his habilitation on DNA repair proteins at the Eidgenössischen Technischen Hochschule Zürich in 1998. From 2000 till 2004 he was Professor for organic chemistry  at the University of Marburg until he became Professor for organic chemistry at the Ludwig Maximilian University of Munich. His main interest is still the DNA repair system.

In 2004, he received the Gottfried Wilhelm Leibniz Prize of the Deutsche Forschungsgemeinschaft, which is the highest honour awarded in German research. In 2008 he became a member of the German Academy of Sciences Leopoldina.

Since 2010, Professor Carell has been an Associate Editor of Chemical Science, the flagship general chemistry journal published by the Royal Society of Chemistry

References 

 Portrait at the Deutschen Forschungs Gesellschaft
 Homepage at the LMU Munich
Interview with Thomas Carell on the website of the Royal Society of Chemistry.

Carell, Thomas
Carell, Thomas
Carell, Thomas
Carell, Thomas
University of Münster alumni
Massachusetts Institute of Technology alumni
Academic staff of the Ludwig Maximilian University of Munich
People from Herford
Gottfried Wilhelm Leibniz Prize winners
Members of the German Academy of Sciences Leopoldina